The Contino Sessions is the second album by British band Death in Vegas, released in 1999.

As of July 2013 it was certified gold by British Phonographic Industry for 100,000 sold units in UK.

In 2000 the album was nominated for the Mercury Music Prize.

Legacy
The album was included in the book 1001 Albums You Must Hear Before You Die.

Track listing 

Notes
  The song was written  by Mick Jagger and Keith Richards as The Rolling Stones song, but was never declared for publishing rights.

Personnel

Death in Vegas
 Richard Fearless – production, keyboards
 Tim Holmes – production, keyboards, engineering
 Ian Button – guitar 
 Seamus Beaghen – additional guitar, keyboards 
 Mat Flint – bass
 Simon Hanson – drums 
 Will Blanchard – drums

Additional musicians
 Spencer Bewley – handclaps on "Dirge"
 Robert Wallace – synths & effects on "Dirge"
 Gary Burns – keyboards on "Neptune City"
 Ali Friend – upright bass on "Lever Street"

Vocalists
 Dot Allison – vocals on "Dirge", choir arrangement on "Aladdin's Story"
 Bobby Gillespie – vocals on "Soul Auctioneer"
 Iggy Pop – vocals on "Aisha"
 Jim Reid – vocals on "Broken Little Sister"
 London Community Gospel Choir – choir on "Aladdin's Story"

Charts

Certifications

References

External links
 

1999 albums
Death in Vegas albums